Couture-sur-Loir (literally Couture on Loir) is a former commune in the Loir-et-Cher department of central France. On 1 January 2019, it was merged into the new commune Vallée-de-Ronsard.

It is situated in the northwest of the Loir-et-Cher department,  to the west of Vendôme. It lies mainly on the left bank of the river Loir.

Geography
Couture is in the canton of Montoire-sur-le-Loir, which corresponds to the historic Bas-Vendômois district.

Adjacent to the village centre (with a crossroad street pattern) or bourg are two parallel settlements, Le Poirier and more distinctly Le Pin.

Economy
The main industry (apart from farming and tourism) is gravel extraction; excavated areas have been adapted for water sports. A number of inhabitants are employed by the paper manufacturers at Bessé-sur-Braye (Sarthe).

History
It is first referred to as Villas culturas in a charter of the 9th-century bishop of Le Mans, Saint Aldric (earlier references are doubtless fictitious).

A partial source for the history of Couture in the later 17th century are the memoirs of Louis XIV's valet, Marie Dubois, who came from the village.

Population

Sights
The housing reflects periods of prosperity and villégiature-type occupation in recent centuries.

Renowned for the Renaissance chateau of La Possonnière, birthplace of the poet Pierre de Ronsard, the village also possesses an Angevin-style church dedicated to Saints Gervase and Protase. The church contains the tombstone of Ronsard's parents and is known for its spire.

Personalities
Notable 20th-century inhabitants have included the Hallopeau and Sainte-Claire Deville families (noted scientists), the academic inspector Jean Pasquier and the Catholic historian François Lebrun. It is also the town where Pierre de Ronsard (1524-1585) was born.

See also
 Braye (river)
Communes of the Loir-et-Cher department

References

Former communes of Loir-et-Cher